Johann Carrasso (born 7 May 1988) is a French football player who is without club since being released by Stade de Reims in summer 2019. He is the younger brother of former France national football team goalkeeper and Bordeaux legend Cédric Carrasso.

Club career

Early career
Born in Avignon, Carrasso began his career at his hometown club Avignon Foot 84. During his last year at the club, he was selected to attend the Centre de Formation de Cavaillon, an exclusive sporting club for goalkeepers. During his time in Cavaillon, he trained and played with nearby club US Le Pontet.

Montpellier HSC
In 2004, Carrasso joined Montpellier's under-16 team. Following his graduation from the academy, he was promoted to the first team for the Ligue 2 2007–08 season and designated as the 2nd keeper behind Geoffrey Jourdren. He made his debut in a Coupe de la Ligue match against Dijon. He made his league debut that season, as well, on 26 October in a 2–3 loss to Clermont Foot starting in place of the injured Jourdren. Following an extensive injury to Jourdren, he made three consecutive starts recording two shutouts against Niort and Guingamp and losing to Ajaccio 1–2. He made two more proficient starts that season.

Just before the start of the 2008–09 season, Carrasso was given the role of first-choice keeper ahead of Jourdren. Over the course of the season, he recorded 12 clean sheets and, along with Montpellier's defense, allowed the third-fewest goals in the league. For his efforts, he was nominated for the Ligue 2 Goalkeeper of the Year award.

Rennes
On 29 June 2010, Rennes confirmed that the club had signed Carrasso from Montpellier on a four-year contract. As a young and substitute goalkeeper, he struggled to hold down a first-team place. On 19 July 2011, he joined AS Monaco on loan for one season.

Stade de Reims
Carrasso helped Stade de Reims win the 2017–18 Ligue 2, helping promote them to the Ligue 1 for the 2018–19 season.

At the expiration of his contract, Carrasso left the club at the end of the 2018-19 season, having made 44 appearances since his arrival in 2016, having largely been used as a substitute goalkeeper behind first choice Edouard Mendy.

International career
Johann earned his first France youth cap with the under-18 team making his debut in the 2006 edition of the Sendai Cup. On 12 November 2009, he earned his first call-up to the France under-21 team. On 18 November 2009, he made his debut for the under-21 team against Denmark.

Honours
Reims
 Ligue 2 (1): 2017–18

References

External links
 LFP Profile
 

Living people
1988 births
Sportspeople from Avignon
French footballers
France under-21 international footballers
Montpellier HSC players
Stade Rennais F.C. players
AS Monaco FC players
FC Metz players
Stade de Reims players
Ligue 1 players
Ligue 2 players
Championnat National players
Association football goalkeepers
AC Avignonnais players
Footballers from Provence-Alpes-Côte d'Azur